Murder in the Second Degree is a 2016 album by the American musical group Yo La Tengo. The album consists of cover songs originally written by other musicians, all of which were played live in the studio by Yo La Tengo as fundraisers for independent radio station WFMU. It is a follow-up to their 2006 compilation album, Yo La Tengo Is Murdering the Classics.

The album cover was created by cartoonist Adrian Tomine, who did the cover of the previous compilation album as well.

Track listing

References

Yo La Tengo albums
2016 albums